Dedrone Holdings is a US-based company which develops counter-drone and counter-unmanned aerial system (C-UAS) technology.

Dedrone software and hardware allow the detection of radio frequencies, video feeds, and other drone electronic signatures. 

According to TechCrunch Dedrone is being used my military forces worldwide.

History 
In February 2014, Seebach, Lamprecht and Seeber founded Dedrone to produce counter-UAS technologies. Dedrone's first sensor named "Multi-Sensor Drone Warning System" and accompanying software "DroneTracker" entered the market in January 2015.

Dedrone identifies a drone without decoding telemetry data but rather by recognizing specific radio frequency (RF) protocols by drone model as a means of drone identification.

In 2015, 52 unauthorized drones were detected in 26 days by Dedrone products over U.S. military facilities in or near Washington D.C.  The following month another 43 unauthorized drones were spotted over a U.S. military facility in the state of Virginia.

In 2016, Dedrone relocated their corporate headquarters from Kassel, Germany to San Francisco, and won the Cisco Innovation Award.

In the same year Dedrone provided anti-drone security for the World Economic Forum in Davos.

In 2020, the founders began to step back, offering the CEO position to Aaditiya Devarakondra. Seebach remains active in the business as COO while Lamprecht currently acts as Executive Chairman and Board Member.

In November 2022, Dedrone started using cameras made by Axis Communicatins, a Sweden-based a surveillance-focused network connectivity company.

Funding 
In April 2015, Dedrone received $3 million in seed funding from venture firm Target Partners. In May 2016, Dedrone raised $10 million, and in May 2017  $15 million.

In 2021–2022 Dedrone closed Series C & C-1 rounds of investing led by Axon Enterprise totaling $60.5 million.

Certifications 
Dedrone was certified by Veracode— a US-based application security company providing multiple software security analysis technologies.

In 2019, Dedrone's counter-drone technology was approved by the UK government Centre for the Protection of National Infrastructure. It was the first official validation of counter-drone technology in the UK.

References 

Counter unmanned air system
Emerging technologies